Saint-Priest station (French: Gare de Saint-Priest) is a railway station serving the town Saint-Priest, a suburb of Lyon in the Lyon Metropolis, east-south France.

Services

The following train services serve the station as of 2022:

See also 

 List of SNCF stations in Auvergne-Rhône-Alpes

References

Railway stations in Lyon Metropolis